Nicholas (Nick) Vergette (1923–1974) was a British potter and sculptor, who produced ceramic murals and figurative works for architectural settings during the 1950s and 1960s. He was Professor of Art at the Southern Illinois University, School of Art and Design from 1960 to 1974.

Biography 
Vergette was born in Lincolnshire in 1923. He studied pottery under Dora Billington at the Central School of Art and Design in London.

In Britain during the 1950s Vergette, Alan Caiger-Smith, Margaret Hine and others including the Rye Pottery made tin-glazed pottery, going against the trend in studio pottery towards stoneware. They all were given the name of "Piccassettes" by the studio potter and art teacher Bernard Leach.

In the early 1950s Newland, Hine and Vergette "formed something of a coterie", sharing a studio in Bayswater and exhibitions at the Crafts Centre and the Studio Club in Piccadilly. The three of them also had participated in a holiday in Spain in 1949 where they "went to Malaga and studied throwing and tin-glaze techniques".

Vergette emigrated to the United States in 1957. From 1960 to 1974 he served as Professor of Art at the School of Art and Design of the Southern Illinois University.

Vergette died of cancer in 1974, two months after completing "Here", a large sculpture piece on the SIU campus.

Reception 
Dora Billington in her 1953 article "The Younger English Potters"  in The Studio noted:

 

Darren Dean in a 1994 article entitled William Newland, Margaret Hine and Nicholas Vergette, 1949-1954 concluded:

Donhauser (1978) recalled, that "Dirk Hubers and Nicolas Vergette are two examples of potters who, through their distinctive form language, added to the diversity of style and attitudes which comprised the American studio-pottery scene during the 1950s."

References

External links 

 Vergette Gallery at cola.siu.edu.

1923 births
1974 deaths
English ceramicists
English sculptors
English male sculptors
Southern Illinois University faculty
20th-century ceramists
British emigrants to the United States